Michelle Karvinen (born 27 March 1990) is a Danish-Finnish ice hockey player and member of the Finnish national team, currently signed with Frölunda HC Dam of the Damettan. Karvinen has been described as "the world's best technical player" and she is considered one of the best currently active ice hockey forwards. With the Finnish national team, she has won three Olympic bronze medals and six IIHF Women's World Championship medals, five bronze and one silver.

Karvinen is a two-time Danish Men's Under-20 Champion, two-time Naisten SM-sarja Champion, three-time Swedish Women's Hockey League (SDHL) Champion, and was the 2020–21 Swiss Women's League Champion with HC Lugano. As of 2021, Karvinen ranks second for points recorded in a single SDHL season and is the seventh leading scorer in league history. Her SDHL career was played with Luleå HF/MSSK, and she is the team's all-time point and goal scorer.

Playing career

Early career 
Raised in Rødovre, Denmark, Karvinen began playing with the minor ice hockey teams of Rødovre SIK, where she played on a line with future NHLers Lars Eller and Mikkel Bødker. As a teen, she played with both the club's top junior men's teams and its senior women's team.

NCAA
She joined the North Dakota Fighting Sioux program in 2010–11. During 15 and 16 October 2011, Karvinen notched five points, and earned a +5 plus/minus rating as North Dakota swept the Vermont Catamounts. In a 9–1 win on 15 October 2011, Karvinen scored two goals and set up another for a three-point performance. She assisted on Jocelyne Lamoureux's game-winning goal at 2:58 of the first period. The following day, she accumulated two more assists in a 4–1 victory. She assisted on the game-winning goal for the second consecutive game, as Monique Lamoureux scored at 15:11 of the second period.

Karvinen played with the North Dakota Fighting Hawks through the 2013–14 season.

Professional 
In 2015, she joined the newly formed club Luleå HF/MSSK of the Riksserien (renamed SDHL in 2016). She scored 79 points in 36 games in her first Riksserien season, setting the single-season league scoring record, as Luleå won the Swedish Championship.
 
She only played 31 games in the 2016–17 SDHL season, scoring 70 points to finish as the league's top scorer for the second year in a row, 17 points ahead of runner-up Jenn Wakefield. She scored five goals in a December match against Djurgårdens IF. She scored the game-winning goal in the 58th minute of the quarterfinals against Brynäs IF to send Luleå to the semi-finals, where they were defeated by HV71.

Karvinen scored 64 points in 34 games in the 2017–18 SDHL season, leading the league in scoring for the third year in a row. She was named the SDHL Forward of the Year as Luleå won the SDHL championship for the second time in three years. During the season, due to the additional needs of the 2018 Winter Olympics, she had left her job at a communications agency to focus on hockey full-time.

In January 2019, she notched six points in a 14–0 victory over Göteborg HC. The following week, she was suspended for four games after a hit to the head in a match against Djurgården. She finished the 2018–19 season with 56 points in 26 games, finishing fourth in the league in scoring. Luleå lost the first two games of the best-of-five playoff finals series against Linköping HC and were facing knockout in overtime of game four when Karvinen scored the game-winning overtime goal to equalize the series and force a game five. Luleå went on to win the decisive game, earning Karvinen her third SDHL championship title.

In May 2020, SVT Sport reported that Karvinen had reached a verbal agreement to leave Luleå and sign with the Shenzhen KRS Vanke Rays in the Zhenskaya Hockey League (ZhHL), in part due to the potentially full-time salary the club would be able to offer her and in part due to her desire to push her development further. However, as the COVID-19 pandemic created obstacles that made the participation of the KRS Vanke Rays in the 2020–21 ZhHL season uncertain, Karvinen opted to sign with the less risky HC Lugano in Switzerland.

She scored 23 points in the first six games of the 2020–21 SWHL A season, leading the league in scoring before the season was temporarily suspended due to players testing positive for COVID-19. After play resumed, she tallied another 26 points in the remaining ten games of the season, finishing the season with more than 3 points per game and 12 points ahead of the next leading scorer. In the eight games of the playoffs, she added another five goals and seven assists. Assisted by Noemi Ryhner and Nicole Bullo, Karvinen scored the gold winning goal in the 52nd minute of Game 4 to claim Swiss Championship victory for Lugano.

International career 
She was the only European selected to the All-Star Team at the 2009 World Championships.

Karvinen scored the gold medal  goal against Canadian goaltender Emerance Maschmeyer in the championship game of the 2017 Nations Cup.

She scored 7 points in 7 games at the 2019 IIHF Women's World Championship, serving as an assistant captain and being named to the tournament all-star team as Finland won silver for the first time in the country's history.

Personal life 
Karvinen's father is Finnish, and her mother is Danish. She holds dual Finnish-Danish citizenship. Her brother, Jannik Karvinen, played over 500 games for the Rødovre Mighty Bulls and made a handful of appearances for the Danish men's national team.

Karvinen holds a degree in graphic design and technology from the University of North Dakota. She designed the logo for the 2019 IIHF Women's World Championship, held in Finland, incorporating the silhouette of Finnish legend Riikka Sallinen.

When asked about changing public perception of women's hockey in a 2018 interview, she stated, "We put down the same time and effort, and we need to be treated the same way. It’s that simple." She has called for women's professional players to be given living wages, stating that "We have to give 200% of ourselves – 100% at work and another 100% at hockey."

Career statistics

Regular season and playoffs

International

Sources:

Awards and honors

References

External links

Living people
1990 births
People from Rødovre
Finnish women's ice hockey forwards
Danish women's ice hockey forwards
Shenzhen KRS Vanke Rays players
HC Lugano players
Luleå HF/MSSK players
North Dakota Fighting Hawks women's ice hockey players
Espoo Blues Naiset players
Ice hockey players at the 2010 Winter Olympics
Ice hockey players at the 2014 Winter Olympics
Ice hockey players at the 2018 Winter Olympics
Ice hockey players at the 2022 Winter Olympics
Olympic ice hockey players of Finland
Olympic bronze medalists for Finland
Olympic medalists in ice hockey
Medalists at the 2010 Winter Olympics
Medalists at the 2018 Winter Olympics
Medalists at the 2022 Winter Olympics
Danish expatriate ice hockey people
Danish expatriate sportspeople in Russia
Finnish expatriate ice hockey players in Russia
Danish expatriate sportspeople in Sweden
Finnish expatriate ice hockey players in Sweden
Danish expatriate sportspeople in Switzerland
Finnish expatriate ice hockey players in Switzerland
Danish expatriate sportspeople in the United States
Finnish expatriate ice hockey players in the United States
Danish people of Finnish descent
Finnish people of Danish descent
Sportspeople from the Capital Region of Denmark